The Metro Vancouver Regional District (MVRD), or simply Metro Vancouver, is a Canadian political subdivision and corporate entity representing the metropolitan area of Greater Vancouver, designated by provincial legislation as one of the 28 regional districts in British Columbia. The organization was known as the Regional District of Fraser–Burrard for nearly one year upon incorporating in 1967, and as the Greater Vancouver Regional District (GVRD) from 1968 to 2017.

Metro Vancouver borders Whatcom County, Washington, to the south, the Fraser Valley Regional District to the east, the Squamish-Lillooet Regional District to the north, and the Nanaimo Regional District and Cowichan Valley Regional District across the Strait of Georgia to the west.

The MVRD is under the direction of 23 local authorities and delivers regional services, sets policy and acts as a political forum. The regional district's most populous city is Vancouver, and Metro Vancouver's administrative offices are located in the city of Burnaby. The MVRD's boundaries match those of the Vancouver census metropolitan area (CMA) as identified by Statistics Canada.

History 
The Greater Vancouver Water District and the Greater Vancouver Sewerage and Drainage District were established in 1924 and 1956 respectively. The Government of British Columbia incorporated a regional district for this western portion of the Lower Mainland named the Regional District of Fraser-Burrard on 29 June 1967. Just under a year later, the regional district was renamed as the Greater Vancouver Regional District (GVRD) on 13 June 1968.

In 2007, the GVRD applied to change its official legal name a second time to simply "Metro Vancouver", which was deemed more recognizable at the time. British Columbia's Minister of Community Services denied the application due to the absence of the term "regional district" within the proposed new name, though it was suggested that the GVRD could brand itself under the unofficial name of Metro Vancouver. After nine years, with growing public recognition of Metro Vancouver, the overall success of the brand, and confusion between the brand and the official legal name of the regional district, the GVRD moved in 2016 to change its name to the Metro Vancouver Regional District. The regional district was therefore formally renamed a second time by the Government of British Columbia on 30 January 2017 to the Metro Vancouver Regional District.

Geography 
The Metro Vancouver Regional District (MVRD) is located east of the Strait of Georgia and north of the State of Washington and is bisected by the Fraser River. The boundaries of the MVRD match those of the Vancouver CMA.

Membership 

This regional district comprises 23 local authorities as members: 21 municipalities, one electoral area and one treaty First Nation.

Electoral Area A comprises all unincorporated land within the regional district boundaries, which totals about 818 square kilometres. Most of the area is in the northernmost part of the district, including residential areas and isolated dwellings on Howe Sound between Lions Bay and Horseshoe Bay, on Indian Arm to the north of Deep Cove and Belcarra/Anmore and on the west side of Pitt Lake to the north of Port Coquitlam. Other areas included are Barnston Island on the Fraser River, Passage Island between Bowen Island and West Vancouver, and finally the urban communities of the University of British Columbia and the University Endowment Lands, in which 98% of the population of Electoral Area A lives.

There are also seventeen Indian reserves within the geographical area that are not subject to governance by local authorities or the regional district; they have a combined population of 7,550 (2006).

The cities of Abbotsford and Chilliwack and the district of Mission, located to the east, although often linked to Vancouver in promotions and tourism, are part of a separate regional district, the Fraser Valley Regional District.

Demographics 

The Metro Vancouver Regional District is the densest and most populous regional district in British Columbia, and the second-densest and second-most populous census division in Canada behind Toronto.

Governance 
Metro Vancouver technically comprises four separate corporate entities: the Metro Vancouver Regional District (MVRD), the Greater Vancouver Sewerage and Drainage District (GVS&DD), the Greater Vancouver Water District (GVWD) and the Metro Vancouver Housing Corporation (MVHC). Each of these is governed by a board of directors. The board of the MVRD has 40 directors coming from the 23 local authorities who are MVRD members. The number of directors coming from each local authority is determined by population, and the number of votes allocated to each director further helps proportionally represent the population distribution of the region. Each board director is also an elected official of one of the local authorities, with the exception of the elected representative for Electoral Area A (which has no council).

As of 2017, the organization had about 1,500 employees. The current organizational structure shows ten departments reporting to the Chief Administrative Officer: Human Resources & Corporate Services; External Relations; Financial Services; Legal Services & Aboriginal Relations; Board & Information Services; Liquid Waste Services; Parks & Housing Services; Planning & Environment; Solid Waste Services; and Water Services.

Administrative role 
The principal function of Metro Vancouver is to administer resources and services which are common across the metropolitan area. The Metro Vancouver Board has defined its strategic priorities for 2015 through 2018 in its Board Strategic Plan.

The organization categorizes its work into action areas as described in the following subsections. However, 84% of the organization's budget is spent in three of those areas – the three utilities (water, liquid waste, solid waste). Metro Vancouver's commitments and its members' commitments to each action area are outlined in eight board-approved management plans as referenced below.

Water 

Metro Vancouver's water utility is committed to the goals and strategies in the Drinking Water Management Plan, as approved by the board. The three goals are to:
 Provide clean, safe drinking water
 Ensure the sustainable use of water resources
 Ensure the efficient supply of water

As noted, there are four legal entities that operate under the name Metro Vancouver: the GVWD, the GVS&DD, the MVRD and MVHC. The GVWD provides tap water to a land area covering more than 2,600 km² with all of the water coming from three sources: the Capilano reservoir, the Seymour reservoir and the Coquitlam reservoir. Metro Vancouver controls the Cleveland Dam on the Capilano reservoir, which supplies 40 percent of the district's water.

Liquid waste 
Metro Vancouver operates and maintains the liquid waste facility, which includes managing "the network of trunk sewers, pumping stations and wastewater treatment plants that connect with municipal sewer systems". Throughout operations, the organization is committed to protecting public health and the environment, and recovering as much resources (energy, nutrients, etc.) as possible out of the waste stream.

The liquid waste utility is committed to the goals and strategies in the Integrated Liquid Waste and Resource Management plan, as approved by the board. The three goals are to:
 Protect public health and the environment
 Use liquid waste as a resource
 Effective, affordable and collaborative management

Solid waste 
Metro Vancouver's solid waste utility is committed to the goals and strategies in the Integrated Solid Waste and Resource Management plan, as approved by the board. The four goals are to:
 Minimize waste generation
 Maximize reuse, recycling and material recovery
 Recover energy from the waste stream after material recycling
 Dispose of all waste in landfill after material recycling and energy recovery

One initiative of the organization was the Ashcroft Manor Ranch Mega-Landfill Proposal in Ashcroft, British Columbia, in the Thompson Country of the British Columbia Interior, as there is no more room in the Lower Mainland for Metro Vancouver's garbage. A similar project nearby adjacent to the town of Cache Creek, British Columbia has almost reached capacity. Environmental concerns about the area's sensitive shrub–steppe climate and ecology are strong, while Highland Valley Copper, near Logan Lake, has offered the use of its mine-pit instead. Other MVRD landfill locations serving the regional district in the past have been in the Fraser Mills area, between the Trans-Canada Highway and the Fraser, and at Port Mann, beneath the south foot of the Port Mann Bridge.

Housing 
Metro Vancouver owns and manages housing complexes throughout the region via the Metro Vancouver Housing Corporation (MVHC); it also forms policy on homelessness and affordable housing for the region. The MVHC's board-approved goals, as outlined in the Affordable Housing Strategy, are to:
 Expand the supply and diversity of housing to meet a variety of needs
 Expand the rental supply and balance preservation of existing stock with redevelopment while supporting existing tenants
 Meet housing demand estimates for very low and low income earners
 Increase the rental housing supply along the frequent transit network
 End homelessness in the region

The MVHC's sole shareholder is the Metro Vancouver Regional District. The number of directors of the housing corporation is 13.

Regional planning 
Metro Vancouver works in collaboration with its members to achieve a shared vision of livability across the generations, as laid out in the Regional Growth Strategy (RGS), which was approved by the board in 2011, replacing the Livable Region Strategic Plan (LRSP). Th RGS requires each member local authority to provide a Regional Context Statement to "demonstrate to the Metro Vancouver Board how its Official Community Plan Supports the RGS." The five goals of the RGS are to:
 Create a compact urban area
 Support a sustainable economy
 Protect the environment and respond to climate change impacts
 Develop complete communities
 Support sustainable transportation choices

Regional planning also includes planning and policy-making in agriculture and the food industry. The organization is committed to the goals and strategies in the Regional Food System Strategy, as approved by the board. The goals are to:
 Increase capacity to produce food close to home
 Improve the financial viability of the food sector
 Have people make healthy and sustainable food choices
 Provide everyone with access to healthy, culturally diverse and affordable food
 Maintain a food system consistent with ecological health

In 2018, the organization's board also adopted the Ecological Health Framework, which encapsulates Metro Vancouver’s collective efforts around ecological health and provides guiding principles, goals, and strategies to help achieve the vision of a "beautiful, healthy, and resilient environment for current and future generations." The goals are:
 Goal 1: Build ecological resilience and minimize impacts
 Goal 2: Protect natural areas and conserve ecosystem services
 Goal 3: Nurture nature within communities

Air quality 
The organization runs programs and set policy to protect public health and the environment with respect to air quality, improve visual air quality and minimize the region's contribution to climate change. The organization is committed to the goals and strategies in the Integrated Air Quality and Greenhouse Gas Management Plan, as approved by the board. The three goals are to:
 Protect public health and the environment
 Improve visual air quality
 Minimize the region's contribution to global climate change

Regional parks 
The parks department of Metro Vancouver oversees the development and maintenance of 23 regional parks, as well as various nature reserves and greenways. The organization is committed to the goals and strategies in the Regional Parks Plan, as approved by the board. The four goals are to:
 Promote ecological health
 Promote outdoor recreation for human health and wellness
 Support community stewardship, education and stewardships
 Promote philanthropy and economic opportunities

Regional parks are distinct from municipal parks in that they are typically more "wild" and represent unique geographical zones within the region, such as bogs and mature rainforests.

Regional economic prosperity 
Regional economic prosperity is a service of Metro Vancouver organized to advance a shared prosperity in the region. The service is structured around three functions: fostering collaboration, conducting regional data collection and research, and attracting investment.

Regional federation 
Metro Vancouver undertakes support functions that underpin the rest of its service areas. In these areas, the organization commits to "contribute to the effective and efficient performance of our regional roles through leadership and collaboration with our members and other stakeholders." There are eight strategic directions guiding work in this area:
 Livable and sustainable region: Use livability and sustainability objectives to guide Metro Vancouver services and operations.
 Effective federation: Strengthen the alignment of member and regional objectives.
 Public education: Increase Metro Vancouver's profile by leveraging events and news related to regional services.
 Engagement: Enhance relationships between Metro Vancouver and other orders of government, First Nations and stakeholders.
 Regional transportation: Advocate the merits of integrating regional land use and transportation planning.
 Regional prosperity: Clarify and strengthen Metro Vancouver's role in pursuing a collaborative approach to regional prosperity.
 Emergency preparedness: Collaborate with stakeholders to prepare for major emergencies.
 Fiscal responsibility: Use value for service to guide Metro Vancouver operations and service provision.

The organization's board has also adopted the Corporate Climate Action Plan, the purpose of which is to, "set out strategies and actions to achieve Metro Vancouver's commitment to corporate carbon neutrality and to adapt [its] corporate infrastructure and activities to the anticipated consequences of climate change." The strategies of the plan are to:
 Reduce energy consumption
 Switch to renewable energy
 Maximize energy recovery
 Sequester and remove carbon
 Adapt existing infrastructure and operations
 Plan and build resilient new infrastructure and facilities

See also 

 Greater Vancouver
 Greater Victoria, British Columbia
 Capital Regional District

Notes

References

External links 
 

Geography of Vancouver
Vancouver
Metropolitan planning organizations
Politics of Vancouver
 
Regional districts of British Columbia
Waste management in Canada
Water supply and sanitation in Canada